SG Handball West Wien is a handball club from Wien, Austria. They currently compete in the Handball Liga Austria.

History

In 1946, police lieutenant colonel Herndlm West Wien founded the club. They won the championship 5 times (1968, 1989, 1991, 1992, 1993), they were cup winners 2 times (1991, 1992). The club's greatest international success was fourth place in the EHF Champions League in the 1993/94 season.

Crest, colours, supporters

Kits

Management

Team

Current squad 

Squad for the 2022–23 season

Technical staff
 Head Coach:   Michael Draca
 Assistant Coach:  Sandro Uvodić
 Athletic Trainer:  Nick Haasmann
 Physiotherapist:  Pia Panzenböck
 Physiotherapist:  Julia Sladek

Transfers
Transfers for the 2022–23 season

Joining 
  Gabriel Kofler (RW) from  WAT Fünfhaus

Leaving 
  Julian Ranftl (RW) to  HSG Nordhorn-Lingen
  Julian Schiffleitner (RB) to  BT Füchse
  Julian Pratschner (LW) to  WAT Fünfhaus

Previous Squads

Titles
The club has won the following:

Austrian Championship
 Winner (5) : 1966, 1989, 1991, 1992, 1993

Austrian Cup
 Winner (2) : 1992, 1993

EHF Champions League
 Semifinalist: 1994

EHF ranking

Former club members

Notable former players

  Janko Božović (2001–2006)
  Andreas Dittert (1983–1991)
  Christoph Edelmüller (1992-2004, 2005–2008)
  Patrick Fölser (2011–2014)
  Sebastian Frimmel (2013–2018)
  Matthias Führer (2004–2021)
  Alexander Hermann (2012–2015)
  Wilhelm Jelinek (2005–)
  Jakob Jochmann (2014–2017)
  Florian Kaiper (2004–)
  Marko Katic (2012–)
  Roland Knabl (2008–2011)
  Elias Kofler (2018–)
  Nikola Marinovic (2002–2005)
  Thomas Menzl (1979–1988)
  Werner Möstl (1981-2006, 2008–2010, 2015)
  Dean Pomorisac (2010–2011)
  Fabian Posch (2014–2016)
  Julian Pratschner (2014-2022)
  Julian Ranftl (2013–2022)
  Julian Schiffleitner (2014–2022)
  Philipp Seitz (2015–2021)
  Ibish Thaqi (2000–2001)
  Markus Wagesreiter (2012–2016)
  Konrad Wilczynski (1992-2002, 2011–2014)
  Erwin Feuchtmann (2016–2017)
  Patricio Martínez Chávez (2009–2012)
  Duje Miljak (2014–2016)
  Sandro Uvodić (2012–2021)
  Gábor Hajdú (2016–2018)
  Guðmundur Hólmar Helgason (2018-2020)
  Hannes Jón Jónsson (2015–2016)
  Viggó Kristjánsson (2017-2019)
  Ólafur Bjarki Ragnarsson (2017–2019)
  Jānis Pavlovičs (2012-2013)
  Augustas Strazdas (2011–2016)
  Vladimir Osmajić (2004–2006)
  Igor Butulija (2001–2006)

Former coaches

References

External links
 
 

Austrian handball clubs